F, or f, is the sixth letter in the Latin alphabet, used in the modern English alphabet, the alphabets of other western European languages and others worldwide. Its name in English is ef (pronounced ), and the plural is efs.

History 

Graphically it originally probably depicted either a hook or a club. It may have been based on a comparable Egyptian hieroglyph such as that which represented the word mace (transliterated as ḥ(dj)): T3

The Phoenician form of the letter was adopted into Greek as a vowel, upsilon (which resembled its descendant 'Y' but was also the ancestor of the Roman letters 'U', 'V', and 'W'); and, with another form, as a consonant, digamma, which indicated the pronunciation , as in Phoenician. Latin 'F,' despite being pronounced differently, is ultimately descended from digamma and closely resembles it in form.

After sound changes eliminated  from spoken Greek, digamma was used only as a numeral. However, the Greek alphabet also gave rise to other alphabets, and some of these retained letters descended from digamma. In the Etruscan alphabet, 'F' probably represented , as in Greek, and the Etruscans formed the digraph 'FH' to represent . (At the time these letters were borrowed, there was no Greek letter that represented /f/: the Greek letter phi 'Φ' then represented an aspirated voiceless bilabial plosive , although in Modern Greek it has come to represent .) And so out of the various vav variants in the Mediterranean world, the letter F entered the Roman alphabet attached to a sound which the Greeks did not have. The Roman alphabet forms the basis of the alphabet used today for English and many other languages.

The lowercase 'f' is not related to the visually similar long s, 'ſ' (or medial s). The use of the long s largely died out by the beginning of the 19th century, mostly to prevent confusion with 'f' when using a short mid-bar.

Use in writing systems

English 
In the English writing system  is used to represent the sound , the voiceless labiodental fricative. It is often doubled at the end of words. Exceptionally, it represents the voiced labiodental fricative  in the common word "of". F is the eleventh least frequently used letter in the English language (after G, Y, P, B, V, K, J, X, Q, and Z), with a frequency of about 2.23% in words.

Other languages 
 In French orthography,  is used to represent . It may also be silent at the end of words.
 In Spanish orthography,  is used to represent . 
 In the Hepburn romanization of Japanese,  is used to represent .
 In Welsh orthography,  represents  while  represents .
 In Slavic languages,  is used primarily in words of foreign (Greek, Latin, or Germanic) origin.
 In spoken Icelandic,  in the middle of a word is often pronounced as a v (e.g. Að sofa - to sleep).

International Phonetic Alphabet 
The International Phonetic Alphabet uses  to represent the voiceless labiodental fricative.

In mathematics 
An italic letter  is conventionally used to denote an arbitrary function. See also f with hook (ƒ).

In music 
A bold italic letter  is used in musical notation as a dynamic indicator for "loud or strong". It stands for the Italian word forte.

In education 

In countries such as the United States, the letter "F" is defined as a failure in terms of academic evaluation. Other countries that use this system include Saudi Arabia, Venezuela, and the Netherlands.

In computing 
In the hexadecimal number system, the letter "F" or "f" is used to represent the hexadecimal digit fifteen (equivalent to 1510).

Other uses 

The letter F has become an Internet meme, where it is used to pay respects. This use is derived from the 2014 video game Call of Duty: Advanced Warfare, where in a quick-time event protagonist Jack Mitchell must pay his respects to his friend Will Irons who fell in combat in a previous mission, represented by the player pressing F when playing the PC version. People on the Internet use the letter F usually in a genuine way to express respects, sadness or condolences towards other Internet personalities, Internet memes or other players on certain events, such as death, misfortune or the end of a phenomenon, company, game, series, etc.

Related characters

Ancestors, descendants and siblings 
 F with diacritics:
 Ƒ ƒ
 Ḟ ḟ
 ᵮ 
 ᶂ
 Ꞙ ꞙ : F with stroke is used in the Anthropos phonetic transcription system and older Ewe writing
 ꬵ : Lenis F is used in the Teuthonista phonetic transcription system
 ꜰ : Small capital F was used in the Icelandic First Grammatical Treatise to mark gemination
 ꟳ : Modifier letter capital F - Used to mark tone for the Chatino orthography in Oaxaca, Mexico; Used as a generic transcription for a falling tone; Used in para-IPA notation
 Ꝼ ꝼ : Insular F is used in Norse and Old English contexts
 Ⅎ ⅎ : Claudian letters
 𐤅: Semitic letter Waw, from which the following symbols originally derive
 Ϝ ϝ : Greek letter Digamma, from which F derives
 𐌅 : Old Italic V/F (originally used for V, in languages such as Etruscan and Oscan), which derives from Greek Digamma, and is the ancestor of modern Latin F
 Y y : Latin letter Y, sharing its roots with F
 V v : Latin letter V, also sharing its roots with F
 U u : Latin letter U, which is descended from V
 W w : Latin letter W, also descended from V

Ligatures and abbreviations 
 ₣ : French franc, Latin capital letter F with stroke
  : degree Fahrenheit

Code points 
These are the code points for the forms of the letter in various systems

 1

Other representations

Use as a number
In the hexadecimal (base 16) numbering system, F is a number that corresponds to the number 15 in decimal (base 10) counting.

Notes

References

External links 
 
 
 

ISO basic Latin letters